"Temperature" is the third worldwide and the second US single from Jamaican musician Sean Paul's third studio album, The Trinity (2005). The song uses the dancehall riddim "Applause". Officially, there are two versions of the song, which only differ in their rhythm. The track was produced by Rohan "Snowcone" Fuller and received a positive reception from music critics. Released as the second US single in December 2005, the song reached  1 on the Billboard Hot 100 the following year to become Paul's third US No. 1 single. The single also reached the top 10 in Canada and France and the top 20 in Australia and the United Kingdom.

"Temperature" became Sean Paul's biggest hit single in the US. Even though it only spent one week at No. 1, "Temperature" showed extreme longevity on the Billboard Hot 100, spending 17 weeks in the top 10. Until Nelly Furtado and Timbaland's "Promiscuous", this was the longest run in the top 10 for a single in 2006. It became Sean Paul's first single to sell an excess of one million digital downloads, earning platinum certification.

Music video

The official music video was directed by Little X, in the video, Sean Paul is seen rapping with female backup dancers. The first dance sequence was with blowing leaves, centered in autumn. Then as weather gets cooler, Paul is in the snow while the thermometer freezing, centered in winter. The third sequence is in the rain, centered on spring. Finally, Paul at a tanning salon squirting sunscreen, centered on summer. There is evident sexual innuendo in the squirting of the lotion from the sunscreen bottles. At the end, Paul raps and is in a club while performing to the song "Breakout".

Track listings

US 12-inch single
A1. "Temperature" (album version) – 3:37
A2. "Temperature" (instrumental) – 3:37
B1. "Breakout" (album version) – 2:59
B2. "Breakout" (instrumental) – 2:59

Australian CD single
 "Temperature" (album version)
 "U a Pro"
 "As Time Goes On"

European CD single
 "Temperature" (album version)
 "U a Pro"

UK CD1
 "Temperature" (album version) – 3:37
 "As Time Goes On" – 4:53

UK CD2
 "Temperature" – 3:37
 "As Time Goes On" – 4:53
 "U a Pro" – 2:57
 "Temperature" (video)
 "Temperature" (Mytone ringtone)

Charts

Weekly charts

Year-end charts

Decade-end charts

Certifications

!scope="col" colspan="5"| Ringtone
|-

Release history

See also
 List of Hot 100 number-one singles of 2006 (U.S.)
 List of European number-one hits of 2006

References

External links
 

Sean Paul songs
2005 singles
2005 songs
Atlantic Records singles
Billboard Hot 100 number-one singles
European Hot 100 Singles number-one singles
Music videos directed by Director X
Songs written by Sean Paul
VP Records singles